Arthur Knight Wallis (4 January 1868 – 27 November 1905) was an Irish first-class cricketer and rugby union international.

Born in the Dublin suburb of Donnycarney, Wallis studied medicine at Trinity College, Dublin. While studying at Trinity, he played rugby for Dublin University Football Club and won five Test caps for Ireland in the 1892 Home Nations Championship and the 1893 Home Nations Championship. He also played first-class cricket for Dublin University during their 1895 tour of England, debuting against Cambridge University at Fenner's. He played a further first-class match on the tour against Leicestershire at Leicester, before making a third and final first-class appearance in 1895 against Cambridge University at College Park, Dublin. As a bowler, he took 6 wickets across his three matches, with best innings figures of 3/110. He worked as a doctor in Dublin, where he died in November 1905. His brother, William Wallis, and nephew, Tommy Wallis, also played international rugby for Ireland.

References

External links

1868 births
1905 deaths
Rugby union players from Dublin (city)
Cricketers from Dublin (city)
Alumni of Trinity College Dublin
Irish rugby union players
Dublin University Football Club players
Ireland international rugby union players
Irish cricketers
Dublin University cricketers
19th-century Irish medical doctors
20th-century Irish medical doctors